Seasaar is an island belonging to Estonia.

See also
 List of islands of Estonia

References

Islands of Estonia
Vormsi Parish